The Marlin Democrat is a newspaper headquartered in Marlin, Texas. It, along with Rosebud News, is owned by Marlin Publications, Inc. In July 2015 Central Texas Publishing, LP acquired Marlin Publications.

References

External links
 The Marlin Democrat

Falls County, Texas
Newspapers published in Texas